Fabio Di Mauro is an Italian former professional tennis player.

Di Mauro, a Sicilian player from Catania, competed on the professional tour in the 1980s. He reached a best singles world ranking of 302 and made two main draw appearances at the Campionati Internazionali di Sicilia. In 1988 he had a win over Alberto Mancini at an ATP Challenger tournament in San Marino.

ATP Challenger finals

Doubles: 1 (0–1)

References

External links
 
 

Year of birth missing (living people)
Living people
Italian male tennis players
Sportspeople from Catania